Masongbon (Masungbo, Musumbu) is a small town and seat of the chiefdom of Makari Gbanti in Bombali District in the Northern Province of Sierra Leone.

Notes

Populated places in Sierra Leone
Northern Province, Sierra Leone